Darlinghurst are an Australian country music group, formed in 2017 consisting of Jason Resch, Pagan Newman, Cassie Leopold and Matt Darvidis. The group's debut self-titled studio album was released on 24 September 2021 and debuted at #1 on the ARIA Country album chart and #9 on the all music genre album ARIA chart. The group's first six singles peaked within the top 5 of the Australian Country Radio chart.

History
In the late 2000s, Jason Resch lived in the United Kingdom, working as songwriter where he co-write "The Promise" for Girls Aloud, "The Boy Does Nothing" for Alesha Dixon and "All Fired Up" for The Saturdays as well as songs with Kylie Minogue and the Pet Shop Boys. In 2013, Resch relocated to and lived in United States before returning to Australia in 2015, intent on creating a new band. Resch says "After the run of hits in Britain and the two-year writing sessions in Los Angeles and Nashville, I returned to Melbourne at the end of 2015 with my options open. I've always loved music and always wanted to write great songs. But I knew something would happen and I figured if I met up with like-minded people, we'd form a band."

In 2017 in Melbourne, Resch was recording at Secret Sound Studios when its co-owner, producer Peter Dacy, told him of two singers using his studio to record original country songs. The plan was for him to write some songs for them, but as soon as Resch met Cassie Leopoldand and Pagan Newman they decided to form a band. Leopold had performed backing vocals for Christine Anu and Olivia Newton-John while Newman had recorded a soul album in the United States and was a music teacher. Leopold and Newman had toured together in a number of tribute bands with Newman saying in 2019 "It was so much fun... with Cassie we were doing a whole heap of seventies and eighties. We did ABBA, Soul Sisters, we did Beach Boys. I'm probably missing a whole heap, but we delved into a lot of them."

In 2019, Leopold came up with the name for the band saying "I'd just written a film script called Darlinghurst about a group of misfits who come from all around Australia to audition for a musical, which is being staged to save a music theatre from being taken away from its owner. It had a country music feel to it, the 'darling' aspect had strong connotations to country music and besides, it was the only name the three of us would agree on."

In 2019, Matt Darvidis was added based on a suggestion from Dacy.

On 2 August 2019, Darlinghurst released their debut single "Sorry Won’t Get You Back". This was followed by singles "So Long So Long" "Picture Frame" and "Gotta Go Rodeo" which all reached the Country music top five.

"Where Do We Go" was released in January 2021, "Unfaithful" was released in May 2021, and "You Stopped Making Sense" featuring Shannon Noll was released in August 2021. All seven singles appear on their debut self-titled album, which was announced on 28 July 2021 alongside an Australian tour.

Band Members 
 Jason Resch – vocals, songwriter, guitar (2017–present)
 Pagan Newman – vocals, songwriter (2017–present)
 Cassie Leopold – vocals, songwriter (2017–present) 
 Matt Darvidis – vocals, songwriter, guitar (2019–present)

Discography

Awards and nominations

CMA Awards
The Country Music Awards of Australia is an annual awards night held in January during the Tamworth Country Music Festival, celebrating recording excellence in the Australian country music industry.
 
! 
|-
|2021
| Darlinghurst
| New Talent of the Year
| 
| 
|-
|rowspan="3"| 2022 || Darlinghurst ("Where Do We Go") || New Talent of the Year ||  || 
|-
| (unknown)
| (unknown)
| 
|rowspan="2"| 
|-
| (unknown)
| (unknown)
| 
|-

References

Musical groups established in 2017
Australian country music groups
2017 establishments in Australia